Friulimicin B is a lipopeptide antibiotic produced by Actinoplanes friuliensis. It includes the unusual amino acid methylaspartate.

References

Antibiotics
Lipopeptides
Cyclic peptides